Moira Cargill (born 10 December 1958) is a British former alpine skier who competed in the 1980 Winter Olympics.

References

External links
 

1958 births
Living people
British female alpine skiers
Olympic alpine skiers of Great Britain
Alpine skiers at the 1980 Winter Olympics